Winter Haven High School is a four-year public high school located in Winter Haven, Florida, a city of 27,855 (2004 census).

History 
The school opened in 1886 on the second floor of Boyd’s Hall, currently where City Hall stands. In 1890, a frame school building was built at the corner of Central Avenue and First Street.

When the student population reached 200 in 1912, more space was added onto the structure. Three years later a brick building replaced the wood-framed ones to make room for all elementary and high school students in 12 grades.

In 1922, an eight-room structure for the high school was built on Fourth Street, the present annex (demolished in Winter/Spring 1971) at Denison Junior High School. In 1925 a large stucco building (also now demolished) was built on the adjacent lot for the high school, and the smaller building became a junior high department.

The current structure was built on Sixth Street in 1955 on a  tract of land. The late 1980s and 1990s saw a tremendous expansion of the campus, including  a new gymnasium, music building and administrative offices.

The full reconstruction of the school commenced in the fall of 2009. All of the original campus (not including the auditorium, which was the original gymnasium) was demolished and replaced with a total of four new buildings (33, 34, 35, 36). An estimated 24 million dollars was spent on the construction and the new building boast two stories, new laboratories, kitchens, and art rooms.

Most recently, it was announced on January 4, 2012, that Winter Haven High School became a "B" school. This was a major achievement and showed that school was and still is making progress as it continues to be a "B" school.

The School also offers the Cambridge Program from the university of Cambridge in England. It is a great program that offers students an opportunity for world wide leading universities.

The school held a “Celebrate Blue and Gold” event Sept. 15, 2006 to mark the school’s 120th anniversary.

Athletics 
The girls basketball team won the state championship in 2005, 2007, and recently in 2016. In 2015 the school made their first ever girls weightlifting team.

Band 
The WHHS band program, which dates from 1936, consists of the "Pride of Winter Haven" Marching Band, including the Devilette Dance and Flag Ensemble, the Symphonic and Concert Bands, "Messengers" Jazz orchestra, Percussion Ensemble and many student-led ensembles.

The Winter Haven High School Marching Band, also known as "The Pride of Winter Haven," performs at football games, marching band competitions, community events and local and national parades. It has performed in many national events, including the Washington DC National Cherry Blossom Parade in the 1960s, the  Macy's Thanksgiving Day Parade in the mid-1990s and then later in 1998 St. Patrick's Day Parade in New York City. In 2011 they received their 12th consecutive FBA "Straight Superiors" at the District 12 marching competition.

The Symphonic Band performed at Carnegie Hall in New York City on May 24, 2008 with two other ensembles, The Caltech-Occidental Concert Band from California and Jackson High School Wind Ensemble from Washington.

Notable people
 Trey Mancini, MLB baseball player for Baltimore Orioles 
 James H. Ammons, former president of Florida A&M University
 Andre Berto, boxer
 Otis Birdsong, NBA basketball player
 Kenneth Brokenburr, Olympic sprinter
 Stephen Christian, vocalist for rock band Anberlin
 John Covington, football player
 Rowdy Gaines, swimmer, Olympic gold medalist, TV analyst
 John Michael Harrison, student 1979-1982, entrepreneur
 Tiffany Hayes, basketball player
 Scott Helvenston, former Navy SEAL
 Kent LaVoie, musician, songwriter, performed as Lobo in band with Gram Parsons and Jim Stafford titled The Rumours
 Charlie Manning, professional baseball player (Washington Nationals)
 Joseph Milligan, guitarist for rock band Anberlin
 Kathleen Parker, nationally syndicated columnist, class of 1969
 Gram Parsons, student in 1961-63, singer/songwriter and member of The Byrds, founder of The Flying Burrito Brothers, discoverer of Emmylou Harris
 Fred Ridley, golfer, U.S. Amateur and Walker Cup champion
 Jordan Schafer, major league outfielder for St. Louis Cardinals
 Jim Stafford, musician, songwriter, in band with Gram Parsons and Kent LaVoie titled The Rumours
 Sally Wheeler, actress
 Gary Wright, actor, singer, arts education presenter

References

External links 
 WHHS Band
 Florida High School Athletic Association
 Polk County School District

Buildings and structures in Winter Haven, Florida
High schools in Polk County, Florida
Public high schools in Florida
Educational institutions established in 1886
1886 establishments in Florida